Horní Kozolupy is a municipality and village in Tachov District in the Plzeň Region of the Czech Republic. It has about 300 inhabitants.

Administrative parts
Villages of Očín, Slavice and Strahov are administrative parts of Horní Kozolupy.

Gallery

References

Villages in Tachov District